Tian (also Romanized as Tīān, Ţīān, and Tayūn; also known as Tbiān, Zīān, and Qāsimābād) is a village in Silakhor-e Sharqi Rural District, in the Central District of Azna County, Lorestan Province, Iran. At the 2006 census, its population was 637, in 118 families.

References 

Towns and villages in Azna County